Sir Alexander Cross, 1st Baronet (4 November 1847 – 13 February 1914), was a Scottish politician. He served as the Liberal Unionist MP for Glasgow Camlachie.

He was elected in 1892, but towards the end of his time as an MP he defected to the Liberals and lost his seat to the Liberal Unionists in January 1910. On 5 July 1912 he was appointed a Baronet, of Marchbank Wood in the Parish of Kilpatrick Juxta in the County of Dumfries and of the City of Glasgow, this title was held by the Cross Baronets until it became extinct in 1963.

References

External links 
 

Members of the Parliament of the United Kingdom for Glasgow constituencies
1847 births
1914 deaths
Liberal Unionist Party MPs for Scottish constituencies
Scottish Liberal Party MPs
UK MPs 1892–1895
UK MPs 1895–1900
UK MPs 1900–1906
UK MPs 1906–1910
Baronets in the Baronetage of the United Kingdom
19th-century Scottish people
Scottish knights